Raúl Rodríguez Navarro (born 22 September 1987) is a Spanish former professional footballer who played as a central defender.

He played 92 matches for Espanyol, and subsequently competed in the United States, China and Kuwait.

Club career

Espanyol
Born in Barcelona, Catalonia, Rodríguez made his professional debut with UDA Gramenet, going on to play three full Segunda División B seasons with the team. In summer 2010 he signed for neighbouring RCD Espanyol, being initially assigned to their reserves.

After Víctor Ruiz was sold in the 2011 January transfer window, and Juan Forlín suffered a serious injury, Rodríguez was propelled to the first team by manager Mauricio Pochettino. On 27 November 2010 he made his La Liga debut, coming on as a substitute for Dani Osvaldo in the last minute of a 3–2 away win against Atlético Madrid, and finished his first professional season with ten appearances, including eight starts.

Rodríguez was definitely promoted to the main squad on 1 August 2011. He renewed his contract with the club in June 2012, running until 2015.

On 8 January 2015, having been completely ostracised by new coach Sergio, Rodríguez cut ties with the Pericos as his link was due to expire on 30 June.

Abroad
On 9 January 2015, Houston Dynamo of Major League Soccer announced they had signed Rodríguez. He made his debut for his new team on 8 March, being replaced in injury time of a 1–0 home win over the Columbus Crew. His first goal came on 26 April, in a 4–4 draw against Sporting Kansas City.

After leaving the United States, Rodríguez played for China League One pair Shanghai Shenxin F.C. and Meizhou Meixian Techand F.C. before signing for Al-Arabi SC of the Kuwaiti Premier League in 2019. He was signed for all three clubs by compatriot manager Juan Ignacio Martínez.

International career
Rodríguez was never capped by Spain at any level. He played one match for the Catalonia representative side on 30 December 2011, a goalless draw with Tunisia at his club ground the Estadi Olímpic Lluís Companys, as a half-time substitute for Gerard Piqué.

Club statistics

References

External links

1987 births
Living people
Spanish footballers
Footballers from Barcelona
Association football defenders
La Liga players
Segunda División B players
Tercera División players
UE Vilassar de Mar players
UDA Gramenet footballers
RCD Espanyol B footballers
RCD Espanyol footballers
Major League Soccer players
Houston Dynamo FC players
China League One players
Shanghai Shenxin F.C. players
Guangdong South China Tiger F.C. players
Kuwait Premier League players
Al-Arabi SC (Kuwait) players
Catalonia international footballers
Spanish expatriate footballers
Expatriate soccer players in the United States
Expatriate footballers in China
Expatriate footballers in Kuwait
Spanish expatriate sportspeople in the United States
Spanish expatriate sportspeople in China
Spanish expatriate sportspeople in Kuwait